Flatwillow (also Flatwillow Crossing) is a former unincorporated town in southern Petroleum County, Montana, United States.  All buildings of the town are now gone, and the land is now privately owned farmland.

History

Flatwillow lay along local roads south of the town of Winnett, the county seat of Petroleum County.  at an elevation of 3,225 feet (983 m).  Flatwillow's post office first opened on March 27, 1883 and closed on April 15, 1907, only to be reopened on August 1, 1908.  The post office was again closed on April 30, 1946.

Climate

Flatwillow has a cold semi-arid climate (BSk). Winter is cold, dry and variable. It can alternate between periods of extreme cold and milder stretches with days well above freezing. The average annual minimum is -26, placing it in hardiness zone 4A. Lows fall below 0 on 20 days per year while highs stay below 0 on 2 days a year. Spring comes quickly in March but still gets snow as late as May. This is the wettest time of year with frequent showers and thunderstorms. Summer is hot and dry with chilly nights. Days pass 90 on 35 days/year and 100 on just over 3. However, there is still a decent amount of cool days and nights are pleasantly cool. Fall comes rapidly with snow possible in September.

The freeze-free season ranges from May 24 to September 23. The coldest temperature was -48 (-44.4 C) on December 18, 1924 while the record high is 108 (42.2 C), most recently on July 22, 1963. The most snow in one season is at least 83.0” in 2017–2018. Snowfall in April and May has not been counted yet, so that number will be gene higher. The least snow in a season was 7.3” in 1915–1916.

References

Unincorporated communities in Petroleum County, Montana
Unincorporated communities in Montana